Conisbrough Parks is a civil parish in the Metropolitan Borough of Doncaster and ceremonial county of South Yorkshire in England.  It had a population of 385 at the 2001 Census, reducing to 374 at the 2011 Census.

The parish covers mostly rural land between the towns of Conisbrough and Edlington including the small village of Clifton.

References

Civil parishes in South Yorkshire
Geography of the Metropolitan Borough of Doncaster